is a former Japanese football player.

Club statistics

References

External links

1986 births
Living people
Association football people from Kanagawa Prefecture
Japanese footballers
J2 League players
Japan Football League players
Shonan Bellmare players
SC Sagamihara players
Association football forwards